Barbara Krafftówna (a.k.a. Barbara Krafft-Seidner; 5 December 1928 – 23 January 2022) was a Polish film actress. She appeared in more than 40 films and television shows between 1946 and 2022. She died in 
Skolimów on 23 January 2022, at the age of 93.

Selected filmography
 Tonight a City Will Die (1961)
 How to Be Loved (1963)
 The Saragossa Manuscript (1965)
 The Codes (1966)

References

External links

1928 births
2022 deaths
20th-century Polish actresses
Polish film actresses
Polish stage actresses
Actresses from Warsaw
Polish cabaret performers
Officers of the Order of Polonia Restituta
Commanders of the Order of Polonia Restituta
Polish television actresses